Donald Balloch MacDonald (Scottish Gaelic: Dòmhnall Ballach Mac Dhòmhnaill) Scottish-Gaelic lord, died about 1476.

Biography

MacDonald was a son of John Mór Tanister and Margery Byset, daughter of MacEoin Bisset, Lord of The Glens. He was the second lord of Clan MacDonald of Dunnyveg.

He succeeded to the lordship after his father was murdered by James Campbell after a scheduled meeting at Ard-du, Islay in 1427. MacDonald took revenge and James Campbell was executed, protesting however, that it was done under the orders of King James I of Scotland.

Known as a military leader he was chosen to lead Clan Donald and defeated the forces of King James I at the battle of Inverlochy in 1431.  Subsequently, after a number of defeats against Royal forces Mac Dhòmhnail was forced to flee to Ireland. A pickled head was presented by his friend, the Irish king, Owen McNiall Og O'Neill, who presented it to the King James I, as that of MacDonald. After the death of King James I, he returned to Dunnyveg in 1437.

He died on an islet upon Loch Gruinart, Islay about 1476.

Family
By his first wife Johanna, daughter of Conn O'Neill of Edenduffcarrick, they had;

John Mor MacDonald, m. Sabina O'Neill, daughter of Phelim Bacagh O'Neill
Margaret, b. c. 1414 married Ruari MacDonald, 3rd of Clan Ranald.

By his second wife Joan, daughter of O'Donnell, Lord of Tyrconnel, they had;

Agnes, who married Thomas Bannatyne of Knraes.

Notes

References
 

1476 deaths
Donald
Donald
15th-century Scottish people
15th-century Irish people
Medieval Gaels
Medieval Gaels from Scotland